The Family Sign is the sixth studio album by American hip hop group Atmosphere. It was released on Rhymesayers Entertainment on April 12, 2011. The album debuted at number 13 on the Billboard 200 selling 28,000 copies in its first week.

Reception
At Metacritic, which assigns a weighted average score out of 100 to reviews from mainstream critics, The Family Sign received an average score of 73% based on 20 reviews, indicating "generally favorable reviews".

Commenting on Slug's writing on The Family Sign for College Magazine, Taylor Jaymes wrote that he "is as much a rapper as he is a poet."

Track listing

Personnel
Slug – Vocals
Ant – Production
Nate Collis – Guitar
Erick Anderson – Keyboards

Charts

Weekly charts

Year-end charts

References

External links
 

2011 albums
Atmosphere (music group) albums
Rhymesayers Entertainment albums